Universal Music Latin Entertainment, a division of Universal Music Group, is a record company specialized in producing and distributing Latin music in Mexico, the United States, and Puerto Rico. UMLE includes famous Latin music labels such as Universal Music Latino, Fonovisa Records, Universal Music Mexico, Capitol Latin, Machete Music and Disa Records.

The record company was created in 2008 with the acquisition of Univision Music Group and combining it with Universal Music's top Latin artists, along with much of the Latin back catalog of UMG.

Labels

Univision Records (2001–2008)
Launched mid 2001, Univision Records already had an impressive artist roster:  Anasol, Pilar Montenegro, Anaís, Jennifer Peña, Graciela Beltrán, Iman, Los Forasteros, Daniel René, and most recently Mexican Ranchero music icon, Pepe Aguilar.
 In 2003, Jennifer Peña became the only female artist nominated for a Grammy in the "Best Mexican/Mexican-American Album" category.
The label was dissolved in May 2008 with Univision Music Group being acquired.

Fonovisa Records
Acquired in 2002 back then by Univision Music Group, Fonovisa is the largest Regional Mexican label in the music industry  and since 1984 has launched major Latin stars into international markets and mainstream America.
 Fonovisa's impressive roster of over 120 artists include multi-platinum artists Marco Antonio Solís, La Banda el Recodo, Conjunto Primavera, Los Temerarios, and Los Tigres del Norte.

Disa Records
Disa Records is the second largest Regional-Mexican label after Fonovisa.  It was owned by the Chávez family of Monterrey until June 2001, when Univision acquired 50% of Disa from the Chávez family. In November 2006 Univision acquired the other 50% of the label making it a subsidiary of Univision Music Group. 
 Disa represents over 50 artists, many of which are household names in Spanish-language music, including Palomo, Los Angeles Azules, Grupo Bryndis, Liberación, El Poder del Norte, and most recently, renowned Mexican actress and singer, Aracely Arámbula.

Machete Music
Machete Music includes the top reggaeton artists from Puerto Rico and Latin artists from all over the world. Artists like Akwid, Wisin & Yandel, Ivy Queen, Daddy Yankee, Don Omar, Molotov, and others.

Universal Music Latino
Formed in 1997, Universal Music Latino includes top artists from the Latin music genre, including Lucero, Tono Rosario, music group Belanova, music artists Belinda, Luis Fonsi, Enrique Iglesias, Juanes, Olga Tañón, David Bisbal, Paulina Rubio, and recently Dulce María. PolyGram Latino merged with Universal Music Latino after Universal Music Group's acquisition of PolyGram. In 2006 UML with Vene Music started Siente Music. Canadian born artist Nelly Furtado and Miami rapper Pitbull have also joined Universal to release a Spanish album.

Capitol Latin
Following Universal Music Group's acquisition of EMI Music in 2012, Capitol Latin was merged with UMLE. The label includes artists that were signed on at the time of the acquisition.

Aftercluv Dance Lab
A label which focuses mainly on the electronic music Latin audience. Launched in 2014, musical acts that have signed on to the label include Cher Lloyd, 3Ball MTY, Juan Magan, Atellagali, Marcelo Cic, and Buraka Som Sistema.

Defunct labels
RMM Records & Video
PolyGram Latino
Rodven Records

List of artists on UMLE
This is a list of artist currently signed on to Universal Music Latin Entertainment.

List of former artists on UMLE
These are artists who were formerly signed on to either Universal Music Latin Entertainment or Universal Music Latino.

See also
 List of Universal Music Group labels

References

External links
 
 

 
Labels distributed by Universal Music Group
Latin music record labels
Record labels established in 2008
Companies based in Los Angeles